Pieter Nuyts (1640 – buried 30 March 1709) was a Dutch poet and dramatist. The youngest son of the third Governor of Formosa (also called Pieter Nuyts), the younger Pieter was born into a comfortable situation, probably in Middelburg, before his family moved to the city of Hulst, where his father became mayor.

He authored several books of poetry and plays, including Admetus en Alcestis, a tragedy and satire of Juvenalis. Other works include De Bredaasche Klio and Beschryving van Etten, Leur en Sprundel, which is still used by historians of the region around Etten today.

References

1640 births
1709 deaths
Dutch male poets
People from Hulst
People from Middelburg, Zeeland
Dutch male dramatists and playwrights